Brian Edward Tyms (born February 21, 1989) is a former American football wide receiver. He played college football at Florida A&M. He signed with the San Francisco 49ers as undrafted free agent in 2012. He has also been a member of the Miami Dolphins, Cleveland Browns, New England Patriots, Indianapolis Colts, Hamilton Tiger-Cats, Toronto Argonauts, Orlando Apollos, and Salt Lake Stallions.

College career
Tyms played college football at Florida A&M University for the Rattlers.

Professional career

San Francisco 49ers
Tyms went undrafted in the 2012 NFL Draft. During the 2012 preseason, Tyms was on the practice squad for the San Francisco 49ers.

Miami Dolphins
In September 2012, Tyms signed with the Miami Dolphins off the 49ers' practice squad. With the Dolphins, Tyms traveled to New England during the final week of the 2012 regular season.

Cleveland Browns
On October 22, 2013, Tyms signed with the Browns. After spending time on the practice squad, Tyms was elevated to the active roster on December 4, 2013, after defensive end Desmond Bryant was placed on the non-football illness list.

New England Patriots
On July 27, 2014, Tyms signed with the New England Patriots.  On August 7, in a preseason game against the Washington Redskins, Tyms scored his first touchdown as a Patriot. Additionally, he caught 5 passes for 119 yards. After the preseason, Tyms was informed he would be on the 53-man roster following his suspension in April for violating the league's substance abuse policy. Tyms was activated to the 53-man roster on October 6, 2014. Tyms scored his first NFL touchdown on October 12 on a 43-yard pass from Tom Brady. Prior to the touchdown, Tyms had two career NFL receptions for 12 yards. Although he was inactive Tyms earned a Super Bowl ring as the Patriots defeated the Seattle Seahawks 28-24 in Super Bowl XLIX.

Tyms was placed on the Patriots' injured reserve on August 25, 2015 and the Patriots did not tender him a contract at the conclusion of the league year.

Indianapolis Colts
On April 7, 2016, Tyms signed with the Indianapolis Colts.

Hamilton Tiger-Cats
On October 24, 2016, Tyms was signed to the Hamilton Tiger-Cats' practice roster. Tyms played in the final game of the regular season and the Tiger-Cats' lone playoff game. In his one regular season game he caught 4 passes for 33 yards with 1 touchdown. He had a breakout performance in the Eastern Division Semi Final against the Eskimos, catching a game high 8 passes for 114 yards. Nevertheless, the Tiger-Cats were defeated 24-21, thus ending their 2016 season. The following year, Tyms played 8 games and hauled in 25 passes for 204 yards. He was released in September 2017.

Toronto Argonauts
On September 14, 2017, Tyms was signed to the Toronto Argonauts practice roster. The Argos went on to win the 105th Grey Cup championship game, making Tyms a rare player who has won both a Super Bowl and a Grey Cup. He signed an extension, but was released by the team on July 2, 2018 following two games, in which he made 7 catches for 55 yards.

Orlando Apollos
Tyms was announced as having joined the Orlando Apollos of the Alliance of American Football in 2018.  He was released at the conclusion of training camp.

Salt Lake Stallions
On February 19, 2019, Tyms signed with the Salt Lake Stallions. In the six games Tyms played in prior to the league suspending operations, he caught 11 passes for 82 yards. The league ceased operations in April 2019.

Personal life
Tyms was born in Kent, Washington, he was raised as a foster child, growing up in Fort Lauderdale, Florida.

References

External links

Toronto Argonauts bio
Miami Dolphins bio

1989 births
Living people
American football wide receivers
American players of Canadian football
Canadian football wide receivers
Cleveland Browns players
Florida A&M Rattlers football players
Hamilton Tiger-Cats players
Indianapolis Colts players
Miami Dolphins players
New England Patriots players
Orlando Apollos players
Sportspeople from Kent, Washington
Players of American football from Fort Lauderdale, Florida
Players of Canadian football from Fort Lauderdale, Florida
Salt Lake Stallions players
San Francisco 49ers players
Toronto Argonauts players